Balgarup River is a river in Western Australia that has its headwaters south-east of Kojonup just below Byenup Hill.

The river flows is a north-westerly direction crossing Albany Highway south of Kojonup then through the town of Muradup and continues in the north-west direction until it joins the Blackwood River of which it is a tributary.

The only tributary to the Balgarup river is Mandalup Brook.

The name originated from Aborigine language and is thought to mean "place of the Blackboy trees". The first person to chart the river was surveyor Alfred Hillman in 1840.

References

Blackwood River
Rivers of the South West region